Miconia fallax is a species of shrub in the family Melastomataceae. It is native to South America.

References

fallax
Flora of Peru
Flora of Brazil
Flora of Bolivia
Flora of Paraguay
Flora of Guyana
Flora of Venezuela
Flora of Suriname